Lucia Morico (born 12 December 1975 in Fano) is an Italian judoka.

She won a bronze medal in the half-heavyweight (78 kg) division at the 2004 Summer Olympics.

References

External links
 
 
 

1975 births
Living people
Italian female judoka
Olympic judoka of Italy
Olympic bronze medalists for Italy
Olympic medalists in judo
Medalists at the 2004 Summer Olympics
Judoka at the 2004 Summer Olympics
Judoka at the 2008 Summer Olympics
People from Fano
Universiade medalists in judo
Mediterranean Games gold medalists for Italy
Mediterranean Games medalists in judo
Competitors at the 2001 Mediterranean Games
Universiade bronze medalists for Italy
Judoka of Fiamme Gialle
Medalists at the 1999 Summer Universiade
Sportspeople from the Province of Pesaro and Urbino